The 1999–2000 Israeli Women's Cup (Gvia HaMedina Nashim) was the 2nd season of Israel's women's nationwide football cup competition.

The competition was won by Maccabi Haifa who had beaten ASA Tel Aviv University 1–0 in the final.

Results

First round

Quarter-finals

Semi-finals

Final

References
1999–2000 Israeli Women's Cup Results Women's Football in Israel (via Internet Archive) 

Israel Women's Cup seasons
Cup
Israel